A working cat is type of domestic cat that "works" for its keep by hunting vermin, such as rodents. They are commonly employed where pest control is needed, such as barns, farms, factories, warehouses, stores, churchyards, and private property. Types of working cats include the bodega cat, farm cat, ship's cat, and library cat. A benefit of using a working cat is that they alleviate the need for harmful pesticides. Working cats are often placed in their environment as a part of a working cats program.

The resident cat at the British Prime Minister's home at 10 Downing Street has been given the title Chief Mouser to the Cabinet Office.

Working cats programs 
A working cats program is designed to place cats in safe environments where they are valued for their hunting skills as working cats. These programs are typically offered by animal shelters who will use otherwise unadoptable cats in the program as an alternative to euthanasia. The cats may not be suitable for adoption because they are feral cats or did not acclimate to living in close quarters with humans. Working cats programs usually provide cats that are spayed or neutered and fully vaccinated, and any adoption fee is often waived. In exchange for their services, the cats are to receive a place to live, food, water, and vet care.

Feral cats 
A feral cat is a cat without an owner that lives outside. These cats have very minimal to no human contact at all. They tend to hide from humans and do not allow themselves to be touched. Attempts to socialize feral cats often fail or take a long time, and even so some remain afraid of humans.

There are efforts to control the feral cat population, which is a big problem. There are trap neuter return programs, which capture the feral cats, neuter/spay them, and release them back outside. This prevents the cat from reproducing. Others result in euthanasia.

Pros 
Each year in the United States, about 1.5 million shelter animals are put down, and 860,000 of those are cats. Working cat programs decrease those numbers by giving a cat that would not be adoptable a home, providing more room for other shelter animals.

A study that was done at the University of Minnesota showed that taking care of a cat can improve human health. The study showed fewer chances of getting heart attacks, cardiovascular diseases, having trouble sleeping, and anxiety when caring for a cat.

There are also benefits for the community. Feral cats control the population of rodents in a neighborhood, which then negates the need for any harmful pesticides to be used. It also reduces the spread of rabies and fleas since they are vaccinated and their caretakers treat them for fleas. These programs also save tax dollars since they are run by volunteers or privately owned.

Cons 

Some disadvantages to feral cats are urine markings and destruction to wildlife and property. Feral cats are wild, and they will continue to act as such even when placed into the care of a caretaker. They may also injure other pets that get too close.

Another disadvantage is veterinary care. Cat's must eventually get another round of vaccinations. Capturing a feral cat can be difficult, and some caretakers do not care to take the animal to the vet again. If they do not get their vaccinations when they are due, the cats can contract and spread diseases. Cats are three to four times more likely to get rabies than other domestic animals like dogs.

References

http://www.takepart.com/article/2014/03/31/sorry-cat-lovers-trap-neuter-release-flat-out-doesnt-work

https://www.aspca.org/animal-homelessness/shelter-intake-and-surrender/pet-statistics

External links 
 Arizona Humane Society’s Working Cats Program
 Best Friends Animal Society: L.A.’s Working Cats Program

Working cats
Biological pest control
Feral cats
Urban wildlife